Adalton Luis Juvenal or simply Dudu or Dudu Mineiro (born 30 June 1985) is a Brazilian footballer currently playing for Brazilian side Votuporanguense as a forward.

Dudu appeared in the Copa do Brasil for Guará. He played for Brazilian club Clube do Remo before he was bought by Chernomorets Burgas in 2008.

References

External links
Profile at fcthun.ch

Brazilian footballers
Brazilian expatriate footballers
Expatriate footballers in Bulgaria
Esporte Clube São Bento players
1985 births
Living people
First Professional Football League (Bulgaria) players
PFC Chernomorets Burgas players
Brazilian expatriate sportspeople in Bulgaria
FC Thun players
Clube Atlético Votuporanguense players
Association football forwards